is a railway station on the Chitose Line located in Tomakomai, Hokkaidō, Japan. The station is numbered H16.

Lines
Uenae Station is served by the Muroran Main Line.

Station layout
The station consists of two ground-level side platforms serving two tracks. The station has Kitaca card readers (not equipped with regular ticket gates). The station is unattended, and does not have automated ticket machines.

Platforms

Adjacent stations

References

Railway stations in Hokkaido Prefecture
Railway stations in Japan opened in 1926